Nicholas LaPorte Sr. (June 24, 1926 – December 1, 1990) was an American Democratic Party politician who settled in the Great Kills neighborhood of Staten Island, New York. He represented parts of that borough in the New York City Council from 1977–1984, then served as Deputy Borough President from 1985–1989. A street is named "Nick LaPorte Place" in his honor, between Barrett Triangle and Staten Island Borough Hall.

References

1926 births
1990 deaths
American people of Italian descent
New York City Council members
New York (state) Democrats
People from the Bronx
20th-century American politicians
Politicians from Staten Island
People from Great Kills, Staten Island